The following is a list of bands, past and present, who have had recordings released on the Dischord Records label:

Artists
 Alarms & Controls (2010–present)
 Antelope (2001–present)
 The Aquarium (2002–present)
 Artificial Peace (1980–1981)
 Autoclave (1990–1991)
 Beauty Pill (1999–present)
 Beefeater (1984–1986)
 Black Eyes (2001–2004)
 Bluetip (1995–2002)
 Branch Manager (1990–1997)
 The Capitol City Dusters (1996–2003)
 Channels (2003–present)
 Circus Lupus (1990–1993)
 Coriky (2020)
 The Crownhate Ruin (1994–1996)
 Dag Nasty (1985–1991)
 Deadline (1981–1982)
 Deathfix (2009–present)
 Double-O (1983) (Split release with R&B records)
 Edie Sedgwick (1996–2013)
 Egg Hunt (1986)
 El Guapo (1996–2006)
 The EFFECTS (2014–present)
 Embrace (1985–1986)
 The Evens (2001–present)
 The Faith (1980–1983) (Fronted by Alec MacKaye, brother of Ian MacKaye)
 Faraquet (1997–2001, 2007–present)
 Fidelity Jones (1988–1990)
 Fire Party (1986–1990)
 French Toast (2001–2006)
 Fugazi (1987–2002; on a "hiatus of unknown length")
 Government Issue (1981–1989)
 Gray Matter (1983–1986; 1990–1993)
 Happy Go Licky (1987–1988)
 High Back Chairs (1989–1993)
 Holy Rollers (1989–1995)
 Hoover (1992–1994; reformed briefly in 1997 and again in 2004)
 Ignition (1986–1989)
 Iron Cross (1981–1985)
 Jawbox (1989–1997) (first Dischord band to leave for major label in 1993)
 Joe Lally
 Lungfish (1988–present)
 The Make-Up (1995–2000)
 Marginal Man (1982–1988)
 Medications (2003–)
 The Messthetics (2016–present)
 Minor Threat (1980–1983)
 Nation of Ulysses (1988–1992)
 Office of Future Plans (2009–present)
 One Last Wish (1986)
 The Pupils (2000–present)
 Q and Not U (1998–2005)
 Red C (1981)
 Rites of Spring (1984–1986)
 Scream (1981–1990)
 Severin (1989–1993)
 Shudder to Think (1986–1998)
 Skewbald/Grand Union (1981)
 Slant 6 (1992–1995)
 Smart Went Crazy (1993–1998)
 Soccer Team (2006–present)
 Soulside (1986–1989)
 State of Alert (SOA) (1980–1981)
 Teen Idles (1979–1980)
 Three (1986–1988)
 Trusty (1989–1997)
 Untouchables (1979–1981)
 Void (1980–1983)
 The Warmers (1994–1997)
 Youth Brigade (Washington, D.C. band) (1981)

See also 
 Dischord Records

References

Dischord Records